Jovan Hadžić (pseudonym Miloš Svetić; 8 September 1799 – 28 April 1869) was a Serbian writer, legislator and initiator, that is, the principal co-founder of the Serbian cultural society Matica Srpska. He signed his literary work as Miloš Cvetić and was an influential figure in the drafting of the Civil and Criminal Code of Serbia in 1844. Serbia is the fourth modern-day European country after France, Austria and the Netherlands to have a codified legal system because of Hadžić's work.

Jovan Hadžić is remembered as a founder of the Matica Srpska and as the most persistent opponent of Vuk Karadžić's orthographic reform. However, Hadžić was also a poet and translator, a legislator in the Principality of Serbia, as well as an active public figure. Having established a commendable reputation through his early poetry, many thought he could be a worthy successor to Lukijan Mušicki.

Biography
Jovan Hadžić was born in Sombor on the day of the Mala Gospojina in 1799 and comes from one of the wealthiest Serbian families of Hungary. His parents were, father Nikola, a rich Sombor merchant, and his mother Sofia, née Petrović. As he was left without parents at an early age, he was taken in 1812 by his uncle, Bishop Gedeon Petrović of Bačka.

He finished primary school in Serbian and after that, he enrolled in a German school in Sremski Karlovci. He finished high school with great success and then his interest in writing and poetry began.

Hadžić enrolled in philosophy in Pest, but after three years of study, he gave up and began studying law. While studying philosophy, he was interested in antiquity and the ancient Greek language, and at the Faculty of Law, he distinguished himself as one of the best students of Roman law. This fact largely explains the influences of the original Roman law in the Serbian Civil Code. At that time, Hadžić also began writing poetry under the pseudonym Miloš Svetić. In 1822, he continued his education in Vienna, where he became acquainted with Austrian law. He completed his studies in 1824. During his stay in Vienna, he had the opportunity to meet many great personalities of that time who will have a direct impact on his further work, that is. forming his legal way of thinking. He acquired the title of Doctor of All Rights in 1826, and in 1834 settled at Novi Sad, where he was appointed town senator. He married Marija Desančić in 1829 in Novi Sad.

Hadžić arrived in Serbia in 1837, as one of the leading lawyers he was a prominent figure in public life, a participant in political struggles, and an opponent of Prince Miloš Obrenović. He remained in the Serbian principality until 1846, where he proved to be a "born" legislator. He drafted bills based on the Constitution of the Principality of Serbia in 1838. His work is the Serbian Civil Code. He worked on the structure of the Supreme Court of the Principality of Serbia but did not manage to complete the Code of Judicial Procedure. He contributed to the improvement of the position of state and court officials.

In Novi Sad, in 1847, he was elected a member of the Hungarian Parliament in Požuna. He was twice summoned in 1848 as a ministerial adviser at the Ministry of Justice in Pest. After the revolution, judicial organizations in the Serbian Voivodeship had to be accepted. After resigning in 1850, he became president of the District Court in Novi Sad until 1854, when he retired.

He was a free manager for 19 years and was the patron of the Great Serbian Gymnasium in Novi Sad until his death. He helped the then gifted high school student Svetozar Miletić to receive a scholarship of 100 pounds from Bishop Josif Rajačić.

He was also an important person in the cultural life of the Serbs. In 1826, he was the founder and the first president of Matica Srpska, the editor of the Chronicle, and initially an associate of Vuk Karadžić. However, in the mid-1930s, he came into conflict with Vuk over the understanding of literary language. Hadžić is considered to be Karadžić's greatest opponent, but in 1866 he allowed himself to be taught according to Vuk's and Đura Daničić's spelling, and Old Slavonic according to Miklošić, at the Great Serbian Gymnasium in Novi Sad, where he was the school principal later in life.

Work
Serbian Civil Code 1844, work of Jovan Hadžić: Hadžić's literary and scientific work is extensive. Apart from law, he also dealt with poetry, translation, history, and philology. Jovan Hadzić was a student of Lukijan Musicki and his successor. As a poet, he is at the crossroads of the old classicism of Lukijan Mušicki towards newer poetic aspirations whose stimuli came from German literature and our folk poetry. Following the example of his teacher, Hadžić wrote an ode to the glory of prominent contemporaries, patriotic, didactic songs, and showed great interest in political and epic poetry. In his political songs, there is a sense of appropriate, public, current, so that the songs get a distinctly personal tone. Since he was an active participant in the political scene, he speaks about everything openly and engaged. His famous epic poem written in hexameter is The First Crossing of Black George from Serbia to Srem. Karadjordje is also the subject of his main historiographical work, The Serbian Uprising, under Black George (1862).

Jovan Hadžić also worked as a translator. He translated works of the ancient and modern classical tradition: Homer, Virgil, Horace, Friedrich Schiller, Goethe, and many others. He translated parts from the Iliad in the ten, and he translated Horace's "Poetic Art" in two meters, in parallel, in the meter of the original, and in the epic ten. It is from this that we see that his interest was diverse and versatile.

Hadzic was the editor of the first Serbian Civil Code, which was passed in 1844, and with him, he compiled several accompanying laws and legal acts.

Daničić's "War for the Serbian language and spelling" 
Jovan Hadžić was one of the most prominent opponents of Vuk's language reform. He stood out the most after the death of Metropolitan Stefan Stratimirović in 1836. In 1837, Hadžić published his booklet Sitnice jezikoslovne. Then, Vuk estimated that the right moment had come for a public showdown with Hadžić. Vuk and his supporters believed that Hadžić was not competent to speak the language and that the language in which he wrote could not serve as a model. That conflict existed until 1847 when Vuk succeeded in his idea of making the vernacular the literary language. The conflict between Vuk Karadžić and Jovan Hadžić finally ended with the intervention of Đuro Daničića (1825—1882), who in his work "War for the Serbian Language and Spelling" gave arguments against writing in the old alphabet and spelling, but he also pointed out Hadzic's incompetence in philology, saying that he was not able to talk about that issue. This work of Daničić was of crucial importance for the defeat of Jovan Hadžić. Although he and his followers were defeated, aversion to Vuk's reform still existed, so Vuk's opponents continued to use the old alphabet and spelling in their writing, but the young generation of Serbian intellectuals was on Vuk's side.

Today, we find far more negative than positive criticism of Jovan Hadžić's work. The reason for that may be the failure in the conflict with Vuk Kradžić. However, the justification for such an attitude of Hadzic can be found in the influence that his schooling in Habsburg monarchy had on him, but that does not justify him on the philological level. His literary work is, of course, very important in the Serbian literature of the 19th century, but his conservative ideas, which disrupted the attempts to advance in the language at the time, were the ones that somewhat prevented his success in philology.

Jovan Hadžić died in April 1869 and was buried in Novi Sad, in front of the gate of the St. John's Church, where his widow erected a monument to him.

Selected works
 Sud u grammatiki Vekoslava Babukića, 1838
 Golubica s cvetom knižestva srbskog, 1839
 Vukov odgovor na Utuk, 1843
 Utuk 2 ili odgovor na Vukov odgovor, 1844
 Izstupleniia M. Svetića u Utuk II, 1845

See also
 Serbian civil law
 Matica srpska
 Josif Milovuk

References

Sources
 Jovan Skerlić, Istrorija nove srpske knjizevnosti (Belgrade, 1914, 1921) pages 189-192.

1799 births
1869 deaths
19th-century Serbian people
Writers from Sombor
Habsburg Serbs
Translators of Virgil